Louis Victor of Savoy, 4th Prince of Carignano (25 September 1721 – 16 December 1778) headed a cadet branch of the Italian dynasty which reigned over the Kingdom of Piedmont-Sardinia, being known as the Prince of Carignano from 1741 till his death. Upon extinction of the senior line of the family, his great-grandson succeeded to the royal throne as King Charles Albert of Piedmont-Sardinia, while his great-great-grandson, Victor Emmanuel II, became King of Italy.

Biography

Louis Victor was born at the Hôtel de Soissons, the Parisian home of his ancestor Marie de Bourbon, Countess of Soissons, to Victor Amadeus I, Prince of Carignano and his wife Maria Vittoria di Savoia. His father was a grandson of Thomas Francis, Prince of Carignano and thus a descendant of Charles Emmanuel I, Duke of Savoy and Infanta Catherine Michelle of Spain. He was doubly descended from the latter pair, as his mother was a legitimated daughter of Victor Amadeus II of Sardinia and his mistress Jeanne Baptiste d'Albert de Luynes.

One of five children, he was the second son of his parents; his older brother Joseph Victor died an infant in 1716. Louis Victor was thus heir to the cadet branch of the House of Savoy-Carignano from birth. His older sister Anne Thérèse married the Frenchman Charles de Rohan and was Princess de Soubise by marriage. Anne Thérèse was the mother of Madame de Guéméné, official governess to the children of Marie Antoinette and Louis XVI.

Louis Victor grew up in Paris, where his father was both a courtier and an inveterate gambler. Heavily in debt in Piedmont, and sued by his sisters whose dowries he had gambled away, he had fled to France where he lived so luxurious a life that his son was forced to sell significant family assets in that country. He later moved to Piedmont, between Turin and Racconigi.

On 4 May 1740 Louis Victor married Princess Christine of Hesse-Rotenburg-Rheinfels, a sister of the Sardinian king's deceased wife Queen Polyxena (1706–1736). The couple had nine children.

The most renowned of their children, Marie Thérèse, is known to history as the Princesse de Lamballe whose close friendship with Marie Antoinette led to her brutal death during the French Revolution. 

In 1741, Louis Victor's father died and he became the Prince of Carignano.

Louis Victor lost his wife in September, 1778 and died himself on 16 December 1778 at the Palazzo Carignano, the Turin residence of the Savoy-Carignano family. Since 1835 his wife's grave has been in Turin's Basilica of Superga, as is that of Louis Victor.

His descendants include Vittorio Emanuele, Prince of Naples and Amedeo, 5th Duke of Aosta, rival claimants for the defunct throne of the Kingdom of Italy, as well as Prince Lorenz of Belgium, Archduke of Austria-Este, head of a cadet branch of the former imperial House of Habsburg-Lorraine.

Issue

Princess Charlotte (Turin, 17 August 1742 – 20 February 1794) died unmarried; was a nun;
Victor Amadeus II, Prince of Carignano (Turin, 31 October 1743 – September 1780) married Joséphine de Lorraine and had issue;
Princess Leopoldina (Turin, 21 December 1744 – Rome, 17 April 1807) married Andrea IV Doria-Pamphili-Landi, 8th Prince di Melfi, and had issue;
Princess Polyxena (Turin, 31 October 1746 – 20 December 1762) died unmarried;
Princess Gabrielle (Turin, 17 May 1748 – Vienna, 10 April 1828) married Ferdinand Philipp Josef, Prince of Lobkowicz and had issue; ancestor of the current House of Lobkowicz;
Princess Maria Teresa (Turin, 8 September 1749 – Paris, 3 September 1792) married Louis Alexandre de Bourbon, Prince de Lamballe;
Prince Tommaso (Turin, 6 March 1751 – 23 July 1753)
Prince Eugenio, Count of Villafranca (Turin, 21 October 1753 – 30 June 1785) married Elisabeth Anne Magon Boisgarin, and had issue;
Princess Caterina (Turin, 4 April 1762 – 4 September 1823) married Don Filippo Giuseppe Francesco Colonna, 9th Prince di Paliano; had issue, from which the current Princes di Paliano descend.

Ancestry

References

18th-century Italian nobility
Louis Victor
Burials at the Basilica of Superga
1721 births
1778 deaths
Nobility from Paris
18th-century people from Savoy